National Road 41 is a route belonging to the Polish national roads network. The route runs from Nysa to Prudnik, in the Opole Voivodeship, then on to the border with the Czech Republic.

From 1999 to 2003/2004 there was a motorway A41 in Poland, that had nothing in common with national road 41.

Settlements along the National Road 41

Nysa
Niwnica
Wierzbięcice
Piorunkowice
Rudziczka
Niemysłowice
Prudnik
Trzebina

Route plan

References

39